Just Out of Reach is a 1979 Australian film starring Lorna Lesley and Sam Neill.

External links

Just Out of Reach at Australian Screen Online
Just Out of Reach at Oz Movies

Australian drama films
1979 films
1970s Australian films